Don is the soundtrack album to the 2006 Hindi film Don: The Chase Begins Again (a remake of 1978 film of the same name), directed by Farhan Akhtar, and starring Shahrukh Khan, Priyanka Chopra and Boman Irani. The music was released on 27 September 2006, on T-Series. It was one of the best-selling Bollywood soundtracks of the year, with 1.5million units sold in India.

Overview
The film has seven songs composed by Shankar–Ehsaan–Loy with lyrics written by Javed Akhtar. Two of the original songs, "Khaike Paan Banaraswala" and "Yeh Mera Dil" were remade for the movie. The album overall, is very contemporary, stylish and racy. Composers have taken care to maintain the essence of the old Don.

Two of the tracks were redone for the movie, which was originally composed by the duo of Kalyanji Anandji. Shahrukh Khan has rapped in the retro track Khaike Paan Banaraswala, the remix of the old classic, who rendered the song along with Udit Narayan. Yeh Mera Dil, sung by Sunidhi Chauhan, is the second remix of the album, which was originally sung by Asha Bhosle.

The song "Mourya Re" sung by Shankar Mahadevan is a Ganpati song set big in Mumbai. Then there is "Aaj Ki Raat", sung by Alisha Chinai, Mahalakshmi Iyer & Sonu Nigam, which has a trendy 1980s club feel to it. The title song, "Main Hoon Don" which falls in a rave, techno, industrial genre, is rendered by Shaan. The "Don Revisited" track was composed by MIDIval Punditz and the remix of the title track was done by DJ Randolph.

Track listing

Release

The music was released on 27 September 2006, at the Inorbit Mall, Malad, Mumbai. Over 30,000 people attended the function.

RJ Harsh of Radio Mirchi was the host of the event. The programs started off by Shankar, Ehsaan and Loy singing Mourya Re, and gave a brief intro about the album. Isha Koppikar, who plays the role of Anita in the film, performed onstage, and later launched the music with Shahrukh Khan as the lead actress Priyanka Chopra was unable to attend the function. Shahrukh had also performed the rap from Khaike Paan Banaraswala and delivered some dialogues from the film.

Reception

The music received generally favorable reviews from critics. Joginder Tuteja of Bollywood Hungama in his four star review, said, "Shankar Ehsaan Loy do exceedingly well with the soundtrack of 'Don – The Chase Begins Again' and establish their supremacy as the composer trio who can give their own even while rearranging the songs from the past, as seen in 'Khaike Paan' and 'Ye Mera Dil'. While 'Aaj Ki Raat' sits pretty at the top for its innovative appeal, 'Khaike' is a sure shot chartbuster for all generations and 'Main Hoon Don' makes the proceedings exciting, the theme instrumentals too create a great impact and take the proceedings on a fast track." Faridoon Shahryar of IndiaGlitz, said in his review, "Shankar-Ehsaan-Loy cast their spell in the music score of DON. And I am still recovering from the thrilling effect it has left on me." The Rediff review read, "This lavish enterprise has a little bit of everything. An eclectic mix of old, new and everything in between; Don is an unusual presentation of old wine in new bottle."

The music became extremely popular among the public and topped the music charts. The music sold over 1.5million units in India.  Main Hoon Don (Normal/Fncinternational Mix) has been in The Top 20 songs list compiled by Radio Mirchi 98.3 FM every week, on the basis of album sales, on-air requests and research since 28 October 2006 i.e. for 47 weeks. It gained the #1 position on 14 October 2006 in its first entry and has been in the top 20 list ever since, except one case when it disappeared in just one of the compilations.

In popular culture
The song "Aaj Ki Raat" was included in the Academy Award-winning soundtrack Slumdog Millionaire (2008) by A. R. Rahman. It features in the climax of the film Slumdog Millionaire.

Notes

2006 soundtrack albums
Hindi film soundtracks
Shankar–Ehsaan–Loy soundtracks
T-Series (company) soundtrack albums